Grays Creek is a stream in Cole County in the U.S. state of Missouri. It is a tributary of the Missouri River. It flows into the Missouri River floodplain just northwest of Jefferson City.

Grays Creek was named after the local Gray family.

See also
List of rivers of Missouri

References

Rivers of Cole County, Missouri
Rivers of Missouri